Bruno's Supermarkets, LLC was an American chain of grocery stores with its headquarters in Birmingham, Alabama.

It was founded in 1932 by Joseph Bruno in Birmingham. During the company's pinnacle, it operated over 300 stores under the names Bruno's, Food World, Foodmax, Food Fair, Fresh Value, Vincent's Markets, Piggly Wiggly, Consumer Foods, and American Fare in Alabama, Florida, Georgia, Mississippi, Tennessee, and South Carolina. The chain was acquired by Birmingham-based Belle Foods which discontinued the brand in 2012.

History
The company began during the Great Depression as a market opened in Birmingham, Alabama, by Joseph Sam Bruno (October 2, 1912 - January 24, 1996), the son of immigrants from Bisacquino, Sicily.

According to the 1983 book Joe: The Fiftieth Anniversary of Bruno’s Food Stores by Pat Dunbar, "the store would have fit into a modern day meat cooler."  The company grew steadily, with ten stores in place during the 1950s, and 29 stores open under the Bruno's name when it became a publicly traded company in 1971. In 1972, Bruno's opened its discount grocery chain, Food World, which was followed by warehouse-oriented Consumer Foods. As Food World and Consumer Foods became more profitable, the old Bruno's stores began to be phased out.  Consumer Foods was replaced by Food Fair in 1983, and in 1984 Bruno's opened its first Foodmax stores. The 1980s and early 1990s saw Bruno's as a dominant force, not only in Alabama, but in the Southeastern US. In 1988, Bruno's acquired Piggly Wiggly Southern, which operated stores in Georgia. Everything changed when Bruno's top executives, including the chairman and vice chairman of the board, were killed in a plane crash.

On December 11, 1991, the nearly $3 billion company suffered a catastrophic blow when its corporate jet crashed into Lavender Mountain in Rome, Georgia, killing all 9 passengers:  the chairman of the board, Mr. Angelo Bruno; his brother, the vice chairman of the board, Mr. Lee Bruno; Mr Sam Vacarella, senior vice president of merchandising; Mr. Edward C. Hyde, vice president of store operations; Mr. Randy Page, vice president of personnel; Mr. Karl Molica, director of produce; Mrs. Mary Faust, an advertising executive; and two pilots, Mr. John Tesney, and Mr Rob Stamps. The cause of the crash was not released until April 1992 along with the NTSB report, citing pilot error as the main cause of the crash. The senior pilot, John Tesney, who had been flying since World War II, was known for not following procedures and taking unnecessary risks. His co-pilot, Rob Stamps was known for his very keen experience with instrument and technical knowledge of flying. Stamps had already filed two reports/complaints with the FAA regarding John Tesney's disregard of proper aircraft procedures, none of which were followed up due to Tesney's length of flight time and experience. The most basic pre-flight tasks were ignored by the pilot John Tensey the morning of the crash. There was not a pre-flight checklist followed, in a hurry, the aircraft established VFR (visual flight rules) but did not have IFR (instrument flight rules) clearance, which could have only come from Atlanta, GA, because Rome, GA's small airport did not have radar. A very low fog was observed upon landing in Rome, GA nearly an hour before the accident. The Tower at Rome granted VFR clearance with the aircraft planning to get IFR clearance once airborne. There was not only heavy fog with a very low ceiling but there was another smaller prop aircraft student pilot flying above the clouds over Russell Regional Airport, in Rome, GA as well as a TV/Radio tower to the left of the runway at Rome. Neglecting for known knowledge of the heavy fog, TV tower, and small student aircraft that was observed and notated upon landing, the Beechjet received clearance to take off and began to taxi down the runway and lift off and fly to Huntsville, AL. Once in the air, the pilot, John Tesney, became aware of the smaller student aircraft, the TV Tower, and the very low ceiling. Unsure of his proximity to Lavender Mountain, Tesney pulled the aircraft to make a right 360-degree turn to take off and circle back over the airport and then push through the clouds on the way to Rome. Having neglected a pre-flight checklist, heavy fog warning from the tower, and constant warning from co-pilot, Rob Stamps, regarding the location of Lavender Mountain, Tesney took control of the aircraft, climbed using only VFR clearance, and struck the mountain traveling about 280mph, missing clearance of the mountain by only 100 feet. Upon reading the full FAA report, a former US Air Force veteran and 30 year FAA Air Traffic Controller stated it was the most preventable accident that he had ever read about in his entire career.

Following the crash, only 3-5 executives were left, including Founder Joe A. Bruno, who would pass away, at age 83, in 1996, his nephew C.E.O Ronald G. Bruno, who inherited his father's shares of the company stock making him the de facto chairman of the Board, Executive VP Paul Garrison, and Sr. VP for Store Operations, Samie Manzella, with a few others. With the majority of the company leadership and experienced grocers now deceased, the company quickly lost footing in the Birmingham, AL area along with other states and within 4 years the company had been sold to K.K.R., a grocery stores conglomerate.

The crash caused a large outpouring of grief among the Birmingham metropolitan community due to the family and the company's well-known philanthropic contributions. Bruno's quickly cut ties with the families who had lost loved ones in December 1991, as lawsuits began to be filed due to Bruno's gross neglect, causing the airplane crash. In an effort to memorialize Angelo and Lee Bruno, The Bruno's Classic, a PGA Seniors Tour tournament which was announced just prior to the crash, was renamed the Bruno's Memorial Classic.

The 1990s also saw the reintroduction of the Bruno's banner on stores, this time as Bruno's Supercenters and Bruno's Food and Pharmacy, both of which were upper-class stores. In 1996, Bruno's began converting its Foodmax stores to the Bruno's banner in the Nashville, Tennessee, market, including the construction of several new stores to replace smaller, aging ones. Before the process was complete (some stores carried Foodmax signage on the outside and Bruno's signage inside), the company sold these stores to Albertsons, which finished construction, but spent less than 4 years in the market before shuttering all of its Nashville-area locations (most of which later became Publix). In January the same year, Joseph Bruno died at the age of 83.

Another concept, the upscale Vincent's Market, was tried in a one-location experiment in Homewood, Alabama. The experimental store featured a wide variety of prepared foods such as seafood, bakery goods and take-out meals as well as regular grocery sales. Around 2000, Vincent's Market was converted to the Bruno's nameplate (though it was largely unchanged otherwise), and the Vincent's Market name was applied to the deli/bakery departments in all existing Bruno's stores.

In 1995, the company was acquired by Kohlberg Kravis Roberts (KKR), a leveraged buyout firm. That acquisition was ill-fated, as the company's debt structure combined with management missteps and increased competition from Wal-Mart Supercenters to drive it into Chapter 11 bankruptcy. The company emerged from bankruptcy in 2000 after closing a number of unprofitable stores, but acquiring three new stores from the Gregerson's chain in and around Gadsden, Alabama. The company was sold in December 2001 to Ahold, a Dutch corporation, who then combined it with BI-LO. The new management struggled as well, and in 2005, Ahold finally sold the combined operation to Lone Star Funds, a private investment company which also owns Captain D's and Shoney's restaurants. Lone Star then sold some stores to C&S Wholesale Grocers, which operated the new stores under its Southern Family Markets affiliate for a time but closed most of the acquired stores in 2007. C&S Wholesale also is the primary supplier for Bruno's which derives from the agreement between Lone Star and C&S.  C&S would own and operate the logistics and warehouse while Lone Star would own and operate the stores.

On March 20, 2007, Lone Star Funds announced it had spun out Bruno's from BI-LO creating a separate corporate entity. Seven unprofitable stores were closed as a result of this transaction.

In October 2008, Bruno's announced plans to close 22 of their 40 in-store pharmacies "because of their consistently low performance over the last several years and the lack of prospect for turning them around." This left Bruno's with 18 in-store pharmacies within the 66 stores they ran at the time. All inventories and records were sold to CVS/pharmacy, and all employees were either offered severance packages or employment with CVS.

In December 2008 the corporate offices were moved to International Park office park located in Hoover, Alabama.  This move left the former Bruno's headquarters located on Lakeshore Parkway in Birmingham totally in the hands of C&S Wholesale Grocers who acquired the building in 2005 as part of purchasing the former logistics operations and warehouse previously owned by Bruno's.

At the beginning of 2009, Bruno's Supermarkets operated 23 Bruno's stores and 41 Food World stores. 2 Foodmax stores remained in Northport and Oxford.  The Foodmax stores were operated the same way as Food World stores with their name being the only discernible difference.  The two Foodmax stores were tied to labor agreements with the UFCW union, which prevented any name change to the stores. The employees in these stores wore "Food World" uniforms, and the signage in the stores used the Food World banner. Both of these stores were closed following the company's sale to Southern Family Markets.

Bankruptcy
On February 5, 2009, Bruno's announced plans to enter into Chapter 11 bankruptcy reorganisation proceedings. The company planned to continue business as usual for the duration of the bankruptcy. The company retained the advisory firm Alvarez & Marsal to assist in the bankruptcy process. President and CEO Kent Moore resigned and the Company appointed Jim Grady, Senior Director with Alvarez & Marsal, as Chief Restructuring Officer.

On February 18, 2009, Bruno's Supermarkets LLC applied to the bankruptcy court for permission to close 10 stores.  These included 4 in the Birmingham area and 5 in the Montgomery-Auburn area.  They also informed the court that 30 corporate office positions were being eliminated.  This amounts to 15% of the store count and about 30% of the corporate office positions.  They also asked the court for permission to hire a closeout firm to oversee the sell down and closing of the 10 closing stores. These 10 locations were closed by March 31.

On March 9, 2009, Bruno's filed a motion in bankruptcy court requesting approval to renegotiate its agreement with UFCW Local 1657. Bruno's announced its intent to sell some or all of its stores, and is seeking to remove the successor-ship clause from its contracts. The successor-ship clause requires any acquirer of the company or any of its stores to agree, as a term of the sale, to honor the collective bargaining agreements which are currently in place.  The removal of this clause was hoped to make the company more marketable to potential buyers who said they would not buy the company or any stores if they were required to honor the collective bargaining agreements. The court ruled on April 27 that the successor-ship clause and the rest of the collective bargaining agreements would remain intact.

A court-ordered auction of Bruno's assets was held on April 29, 2009. The auction continued into the day on April 30. A hearing on the sale was held on May 4. Court documents show that Southern Family Markets, a subsidiary of C&S Wholesale Grocers, was the only bidder for a significant number of stores.  Southern Family Markets took possession of 57 locations (56 active stores plus one recently closed location).  They elected to operate 31 of those, and turn over the remaining 25 open locations to Hilco Liquidators for "going out of business" sales.  All of the 25 closing stores were closed by May 31, 2009.

In June 2009, Bruno's ceased to exist as stand alone company, with 31 of its locations being absorbed into the Southern Family Markets chain.  As a requirement of the sale agreement, Bruno's petitioned bankruptcy court to change its name to BFW Liquidations, LLC. Southern Family Markets purchased the rights to the banners of Bruno's, Food World, Food Fair, Food Max, and Vincent's Markets, and did not allow Bruno's Supermarkets, LLC to operate under any name which contains any of those banners.

Southern Family Markets continued the use of the Bruno's and Food World brands, and did not convert any of the stores to the Southern Family Markets banner. In fact, some former Food World stores operating under the Southern Family Markets name were converted back to Food World, such as the location in Scottsboro, Alabama.

Bruno's as a defunct brand
In late 2011, newly formed Birmingham-based Belle Foods purchased Southern Family Markets and its 57 stores in Florida, Georgia, Alabama and Mississippi.
20 years after the horrific crash, in 1991, Bruno's would never ever recover nor would any grocery companies who acquired the last few locations would ever find success ever again. As Publix Supermarkets began to move and expand into Alabama, George, Mississippi, Tennessee, and into Virginia, Publix would rise to be, a true successor or Bruno's, as Publix was the closest thing to what Bruno's had been in the 1970's, 80's and very early 1990's

The company announced they would rebrand all locations to the Belle Foods name, eliminating the Bruno's brand entirely. The first location to receive the new look was one of Bruno's former flagship stores in Hoover. It was the only remaining Bruno's store in the Birmingham area.

Belle did not own any of the Piggly Wiggly stores in Birmingham. All of the company's Piggly Wiggly stores in Georgia changed to the Belle Foods name.

Sports Sponsorship
The Bruno's Memorial Classic was an event on the PGA Seniors Tour in which Bruno's was the event sponsor.

The ARCA race at Talledega was sponsored by Bruno's subsidiary Food World from 1994 to 1995 and again from 2001 to 2006. It was called the Food World 500k in 1994 and 1995, the Food World 3000 from 2001 to 2005 and the Food World 250 in 2006.

References

External links

Bruno's Website (archived 2012)
Food World Website (archived 2012)

Companies based in Birmingham, Alabama
Defunct supermarkets of the United States
Economy of the Southeastern United States
Private equity portfolio companies
1932 establishments in Alabama
Retail companies established in 1932
2012 disestablishments in Alabama
Retail companies disestablished in 2012
Companies that filed for Chapter 11 bankruptcy in 1995
Companies that filed for Chapter 11 bankruptcy in 2009